A.D.Cotton or Parvathi Mills Limited is a textile manufacturing company owned by the National Textile Corporation (NTC) in Kollam city, India. The company was founded in 1884 by British citizen A.D. Cotton  and was the lifeline of Kollam before independence. This mill was taken for rent for running by a Tamil enterpriser after Independence as the land was owned by the Kerala State Textile Corporation at that time. It was later was handed over to the NTC. The company has 120 employees, six of which are NTC staffers and 17 are casual workers. The plant has been shut down since 2008 pending modernisation. However, there is demand to build a bird sanctuary connected to backwaters.

History
His Highness Visakham Thirunal Rama Varma, the then Maharaja of Travancore took the initiative to start a spinning mill in Quilon city (now known as Kollam) which was then business capital of Travancore along the Malabar Coast. He donated the land to start the AD Cotton Mill in 1884. The land was handed over to National Textile Corporation in 1974.

The NTC planned to privatize Parvathy Mills in 2005. The plant was added by the Board for Industrial and Financial Reconstruction who had listed it for revival in 2002. The plan was dropped after protests by the Parvathy Mills Workers Union.

Along with many other mills in Mumbai, Coimbatore, Ahmedabad, Aurangabad, Akola, Nanded, Naini, Jaipur and Udaipur, Parvathy Mill was slated for redevelopment and modernisation in 2007 and 2012. To date these improvements have not taken place, and mill has been closed since 2008. The defunct mill's machinery has already become outdated and rusted beyond revival.

Demands for mill's land to start medical college
Representatives from Kollam along with organizations staged a dharna and march in February 2014 to try to obtain the Parvathy Mill land as the site for a government medical college. The mill is on 16.40 acres of prime city land valued at more than Rs.4 billion (US$64 million) as per the market value of 2014. , administrative delays in deciding on a site and obtaining land continue to delay the start of construction of the new college.

References

Companies based in Kollam
Textile companies of India
Government-owned companies of India
Cotton industry in India
Indian companies established in 1884
Manufacturing companies established in 1990